Elizabeth Wallwork (née Donaldson, 20 July 1883 – 4 June 1969) was a New Zealand artist.

Early life 
Born Elizabeth Donaldson on 20 July 1883, in Broughton, England, she was the sixth of nine children of Elizabeth Ann Hibbert and John Donaldson.

In 1911 she moved to New Zealand with her husband, fellow artist, Richard Wallwork, after he was offered position of life master at the Canterbury College School of Art, Christchurch.

Education 
Wallwork studied at Manchester School of Art (previously Municipal School of Art) and at the Slade School of Fine Art in London, receiving two first-class certificates in drawing and in painting in 1907–1908. She was awarded the Lady Whitworth Scholarship.

Career 

Wallwork was known as one of the foremost exponents of pastel portraiture in New Zealand. She also painted in oil and exhibited landscapes.

While in England Wallwork exhibited with Manchester and Liverpool Art Galleries, and the Salon in Paris. In New Zealand she exhibited with several art societies including:
 Auckland Society of Arts
 Canterbury Society of Arts
 New Zealand Academy of Fine Arts
 Otago Art Society
Her work was included in the:
 British Empire Exhibition, London, 1924
 New Zealand and South Seas Exhibition, Dunedin, 1925–1926
 New Zealand Centennial Exhibition of 1940
Work by Wallwork can be found in the collections of the Museum of New Zealand Te Papa Tongarewa and Christchurch Art Gallery Te Puna o Waiwhetu.

References

Further reading 
Artist files for Wallwork are held at:
 Robert and Barbara Stewart Library and Archives, Christchurch Art Gallery Te Puna o Waiwhetu
 Hocken Collections Uare Taoka o Hākena
 Te Aka Matua Research Library, Museum of New Zealand Te Papa Tongarewa
Also see:
 Concise Dictionary of New Zealand Artists McGahey, Kate (2000) Gilt Edge
 Nineteenth Century New Zealand Artists: A Guide and Handbook Platts, Una (1980) Avon Fine Prints

1883 births
1969 deaths
New Zealand painters
New Zealand women painters
People associated with the Museum of New Zealand Te Papa Tongarewa
People associated with the Canterbury Society of Arts
Alumni of the Slade School of Fine Art
People associated with the Auckland Society of Arts
British emigrants to New Zealand